The following are the national records in track cycling in Belarus maintained by the Belarusian Federation of Cycling Sport.

Men

Women

References

External links
 Belarusian Cycling Federation website

Belarus
Records
Track cycling
track cycling